IWJ may refer to:
Interfaith Worker Justice
IATA airport code for Iwami Airport, Masuda, Shimane Prefecture, Japan.